Orin S. Wilcox (September 22, 1898 – March 1986) was an American politician who served in the New York State Assembly from the Jefferson district from 1945 to 1965.

References

1898 births
1986 deaths
Republican Party members of the New York State Assembly
20th-century American politicians